Pierrot Bidon (1 January 1954 - 9 March 2010) was a French circus promoter. He formed circus troupe Archaos in 1984 and directed The Circus of Horrors in 1995. His work with Archaos revolutionised the concept of the contemporary circus in Europe.
The Independent newspaper described him as being "one of the founding fathers of New Circus" while The Daily Telegraph argued his work paved the way for the success of companies such as the Cirque de Soleil.

References

An archive website for Archaos Circus 1988-1991 was launched after the passing of Pierrot Bidon in 2011. It holds film, images, press coverage and stories. You can add your own memories and content. http://www.archaos.info/

1954 births
2009 deaths